The men's 1500 metres race, the longest flat-track race of the 1896 Summer Olympics programme, was the last event on 7 April. It was run in a single heat, with eight athletes competing.

Summary

Albin Lermusiaux of France led for most of the race, but was caught by Flack and Blake 100m from the end and finished with a bronze medal.  Edwin Flack won the race by five meters, becoming the first Australian Olympic champion. The four Greek athletes trailed the other four athletes, though records do not indicate which position the last two finished in.

Background

This was the first appearance of the event, which is one of 12 athletics events to have been held at every Summer Olympics. Albin Lermusiaux of France had held the unofficial world record for two weeks in 1895; the two men who had broken his record since then were not present in Athens. Arthur Blake of the United States and Edwin Flack of Australia were also significant distance runners competing.

Competition format

The competition consisted of a single round.

The track was 330 metres in circumference (unlike modern tracks which are 400 metres), so the race was slightly more than 4.5 laps. The track had very sharp turns and was made of loose cinders, making running difficult. Runners turned clockwise rather than the current counterclockwise turns.

Records

Edwin Flack set the initial Olympic record of 4:15.6 in the only race held.

Schedule

The precise times of the events are not recorded. The 1500 metres was the final event of the second day.

Results

References

Notes
  (Digitally available at la84foundation.org)
  (Excerpt available at la84foundation.org)
 

Men's 1500 metres
1500 metres at the Olympics